Prudnik is a city in south-west Poland.

Prudnik may also refer to:
 Prudnik County, county in Opole, Poland
 Prudnik (river), river of the Czech Republic and Poland
 Gmina Prudnik, gmina in Opole, Poland
 Pogoń Prudnik, Polish basketball team
 Pogoń Prudnik (football), Polish football club
 Prudnik Silesian dialect, Silesian dialect

See also 
 Prudnikov, Russian surname